Davydenko is a Ukrainian surname, derived from the given name David. Notable people with the surname include:

 Anton Davydenko (born 1996), Ukrainian trampoline gymnast
 Nikolay Davydenko (born 1981), Russian tennis player
 Philipp Davydenko (born 1992), Russian tennis player, brother of Nikolay
 Valeriy Davydenko (1973–2020), Ukrainian businessman and politician
 Tamara Davydenko (born 1975), Belarusian rower

See also
 
 Davidenko

Ukrainian-language surnames
Patronymic surnames
Surnames from given names